The Battle of Lepanto  refers to the 1571 Holy League victory over the Ottoman fleet.  

Paintings entitled Battle of Lepanto are all of the 1571 Battle:
 the Battle of Lepanto (Veronese) by Paolo Veronese in the Doge's Palace in Venice
 the Battle of Lepanto (Vicentino painting) by Andrea Vicentino in the Doge's Palace in Venice
 the Battle of Lepanto by Carpoforo Tencalla in the Dominikanerkirche, Vienna (1676)
 The Battle of Lepanto (Luna painting) by Filipino painter and hero Juan Luna

Other works of art
 Lepanto by GK Chesterton

See also
There were also three earlier battles fought in the vicinity of Naupactus (Lepanto):
Battle of Naupactus in 429 BC, an Athenian victory during the Peloponnesian War
Battle of Zonchio in 1499, an Ottoman victory during the Ottoman-Venetian Wars
Battle of Modon (1500) in 1500, an Ottoman victory during the Ottoman-Venetian Wars